Pila ovata is a species of gastropods belonging to the family Ampullariidae.

The species is found in Africa.

References

Ampullariidae